
Libo may refer to:

Places
Libo County, Guizhou, China
Loch Libo, Scotland

People
Lucius Scribonius Libo, several men of plebeian status during the Roman Republic and Empire
Lucius Julius Libo (fl. 267–266 BC), Roman consul
Marcus Annius Libo (fl. 128–162), Roman consul
Marcus Livius Drusus Libo (fl. 28–15 BC), Roman consul
Marcus Scribonius Libo Drusus (fl. 16), accused of conspiring against the Roman emperor Tiberius
Kenneth Libo (1937–2012), American historian

Language
Libo or Kaan language, an Adamawa language of Nigeria
Libo or Palibo language, a Tibetan–Burman language of India

Other uses
Reeb (beer) or Libo, a Chinese beer brand

See also
Li Bo (disambiguation)
Libor